Huarong District is a district of the city of Ezhou, Hubei province, People's Republic of China. The district is named after Huarong Town, the name of which is of disputed origin. Huarong is mentioned in the Romance of the Three Kingdoms.

Huarong is mostly rural. It is mostly located on the right (southern) bank of the Yangtze River, between Ezhou's main urban area (Echeng District) and Liangzihu District in the south and Hongshan District and Jiangxia District of the city of Wuhan in the west. Huarong District faces Xinzhou District and Tuanfeng County across the Yangtze to the north, and Huangzhou District to the east. The district administers islands in the Yangtze including part of Sand Islet near Echeng District and part of People's Islet near Tuanfeng County.

Geography

Administrative divisions
As of 2017, Huarong District administered three towns and two townships:

Transportation
Huarong is served by the Wuhan–Jiujiang Railway and Wuhan–Jiujiang passenger railway.

Gallery

References

County-level divisions of Hubei
Romance of the Three Kingdoms
Ezhou